The Next Best Thing is the second studio album by Ray Wilson. The album gained small commercial success both in Europe and in the United States, following on from his success with Change and the recent tour dates in Europe.

Theme 
The album deals with personal experiences from Ray's perspective including "The Actor" where he sings about his time with the rock band Genesis.

Track listing
 "These Are the Changes" (Ray Wilson)
 "Inside" (Peter Lawlor)
 "How High" (Scott Spence, Wilson)
 "The Fool in Me" (Wilson)
 "Adolescent Breakdown" (Wilson)
 "Sometimes" (Wilson)
 "Alone" (Wilson)
 "Magic Train" (Wilson)
 "The Actor" (Wilson)
 "Ever the Reason" (Spence, Wilson)
 "Pumpkinhead" (Wilson)
 "The Next Best Thing" (Wilson)

Personnel 
Ray Wilson - vocals, lead/acoustic guitars, bass
Irvin Duguid - keyboards
Nir Z - drums
Ashley MacMillan - drums
Brian McAlpine - piano, organ, accordion
Scott Spence - lead/acoustic guitars
Amanda Lyon - backing vocals
Colin Steele - trumpet

Singles 
These Are the Changes (cd single) (June 2004)
These Are the Changes
Ghost (live)
Gypsy (live)
These Are the Changes (radio promo) (June 2004)
These Are the Changes (Benztown Mixdown) 
These Are the Changes (Album Edit)
Gouranga (Live)

2004 albums
Ray Wilson (musician) albums
Inside Out Music albums